Bartley–Tweed Farm is a historic farm located near Newark, New Castle County, Delaware. The property includes three contributing buildings: a stuccoed stone and brick house, a frame bank barn built about 1835, and a late 19th-century frame carriage house / granary.  The stone section of the house dates to the late-18th century and the brick section to about 1825.  The brick section has Federal style details.

It was added to the National Register of Historic Places in 1986.

References

Farms on the National Register of Historic Places in Delaware
Federal architecture in Delaware
Houses completed in 1798
Houses in New Castle County, Delaware
National Register of Historic Places in New Castle County, Delaware